Linda J. Skitka is a professor of psychology at the University of Illinois at Chicago.  Skitka's research bridges a number of areas of inquiry including social, political, and moral psychology.

Publications
She has authored or co-authored papers for the Journal of Personality and Social Psychology, Personality and Social Psychology Bulletin, Journal of Experimental Social Psychology, Social Justice Research, and Political Psychology. She is best known for her research into justice and fairness, moral conviction, and political reasoning.

Affiliations and recognition
She is the current president of the Midwestern Psychological Association, the president-elect for the Society for Personality and Social Psychology, served as president of the International Society for Justice Research from 2006–2008, served on the executive committee for the Society for Experimental Social Psychology, and was the founding chairperson of a consortium of professional societies that collaborated to launch the scholarly journal Social Psychological and Personality Science. Skitka is also on numerous editorial boards for academic journals, has received research funding from National Aeronautics and Space Administration (NASA), the National Science Foundation (NSF), and the Templeton Foundation, and has won several awards for excellence in teaching, mentoring, service and research.

See also

References

Further reading
 

21st-century American women
American moral psychologists
American political psychologists
American political scientists
American social psychologists
American women political scientists
Living people
University of California, Berkeley alumni
University of Illinois Chicago faculty
University of Michigan College of Literature, Science, and the Arts alumni
Year of birth missing (living people)